Synuchus pseudomorphus is a species of ground beetle in the subfamily Harpalinae. It was described by Semenov in 1889.

References

Synuchus
Beetles described in 1889